This was the doubles event in a professional tennis tournament in Monterrey, Mexico.

Florencia Molinero and Laura Pigossi were the defending champions, having won the event in 2013, but lost in the first round.

Lourdes Domínguez Lino and Mariana Duque won the title, defeating Elise Mertens and Arantxa Rus in the final, 6–3, 7–6(7–4).

Seeds

Draw

References 
 Draw

Internacional Femenil Monterrey - Doubles
Internacional Femenil Monterrey